Ferdinand Kuehn (January 22, 1821January 31, 1901) was a German American immigrant, businessman, and Democratic politician.  He served as the 7th State Treasurer of Wisconsin.

Biography

Born in Augsburg, Germany, he worked in banking in Switzerland. In 1844, he moved to Jefferson County, Wisconsin, and then to Milwaukee, Wisconsin, where he worked in the banking industry. He was elected city treasurer and then the city comptroller for the city of Milwaukee. In 1857–1858, he served on the Milwaukee Common Council. From 1874–1878, Kuehn served as Wisconsin State Treasurer.

References

1821 births
1901 deaths
Bavarian emigrants to the United States
Milwaukee Common Council members
Wisconsin city council members
State treasurers of Wisconsin
19th-century American politicians